Zsolt Harsányi (27 January 1887 – 29 November 1943), also known as Zsolt von Harsanyi or Zsolt de Harsanyi, was a prolific and renowned Hungarian author, dramatist, translator, and writer. 

Born in Korompa, Upper Hungary (modern day Slovakia; Krompachy in Slovakian), Harsányi descended from a long line of Hungarian writers. At seventeen years of age, he received a student award from the Hungarian Academy of Sciences. 

His long career produced hundreds of dramatic and literary works, including short and full-length plays, musical comedies, and historical fiction novels.

External links

Profile, imdb.com; accessed 12 October 2017.

1887 births
1943 deaths